The 2018 Toyota Owners 400 was a Monster Energy NASCAR Cup Series race held on April 21, 2018, at Richmond Raceway in Richmond, Virginia. Contested over 402 laps—extended from 400 laps due to an overtime finish, on the 0.75 mile (1.2 km) asphalt short track, it was the ninth race of the 2018 Monster Energy NASCAR Cup Series season.

Report

Background

Richmond Raceway is a 3/4-mile (1.2 km), D-shaped, asphalt race track located just outside Richmond, Virginia in Henrico County. It hosts the Monster Energy NASCAR Cup Series and Xfinity Series. Known as "America's premier short track", it formerly hosted a NASCAR Camping World Truck Series race, an IndyCar Series race, and two USAC sprint car races.

Entry list

Practice

First practice

Final practice

Qualifying

Qualifying results

Race

First stage
Martin Truex Jr. led the field to the green flag at 6:44 p.m., Truex, the reigning series champion, and Elliott started on the front row. It was the third pole of the year for Truex and the best starting spot of the season for Elliott. Joey Logano took the lead from Truex and Logano won the opening stage after leading 62 of the first 100 laps. Almirola was second followed by Kurt Busch, William Byron, Bowyer, Kyle Busch, Chase Elliott, Austin Dillon, Truex and Harvick and the first caution flew for the conclusion of the first stage

Second stage
The race resumed on lap 102, There were two lead changes at the start of the second stage, Joey Logano, who won this race one year ago before being hit with a major penalty that prevented him from using the victory to qualify for the 2017 playoffs, won the second stage after also taking the first. Both stages went caution free. Following Logano, were three Stewart-Haas Racing drivers: Clint Bowyer, Aric Almirola and Kurt Busch. William Byron was fifth, Kyle Busch sixth and Ryan Newman seventh. Brad Keselowski, Martin Truex Jr. and Kevin Harvick rounded out the top 10, and caution flew for the second time for conclusion of the second stage.

Final stage
Back to green on lap 213, Other than cautions for the stage breaks, the yellow flagged remained out of sight through 350 of 400 laps.

Caution flew for the third time when Ricky Stenhouse Jr. made contact with Ryan Blaney and collected Cole Whitt in turn 4. Brad Keselowski made a narrow escape, squeezing past and nearly grazing the inside wall that borders pit road.

The race resumed on lap 362, and caution #4 flew seven laps later for contact between Kurt Busch and Jamie McMurray in turn two caused Ryan Newman to run into the back of McMurray coming off of turn two, which ended up causing Newman’s car to start smoking, McMurray was able to make repairs on pit road and remain in the race, one lap down.

Back to green on lap 379 and the fifth caution of the race flew when avid Ragan spun in turn three, and Kyle Larson won the free pass under the caution.

The race went back under green on lap 398 and the sixth caution of the race flew for debris in turn 3 after Ricky Stenhouse Jr. spun in the wall, sending the race into overtime.

Overtime

The race resumed on lap 400 for a two-lap NASCAR Overtime, Kyle Busch, who started from the 32nd spot, worked his way to the front early on and went on to win his third consecutive race.

Post-race
"All these guys on this M&Ms Camry team do a great job for me. I can't say enough about Adam Stevens and my guys on the pit crew tonight. They won this race for us," Busch said. "They got us off pit road first those last two times that we came down for tires and got us to where we needed to be."

Driver comments
“It's definitely cool we’ve won three in a row. We did it a couple years ago and now I don't know if you can shoot for four in a row," he said. "It's hard to go to Talladega with that much of a winning streak and think that you can go to victory lane, but we’re going to go there anyway and give it a shot. . . . Our guys are amazing. They're awesome every week and I love racing with these guys and Joe Gibbs Racing."

Stage Results

Stage 1
Laps: 100

Stage 2
Laps: 100

Final Stage Results

Stage 3
Laps: 202

Race statistics
 Lead changes: 7 among different drivers
 Cautions/Laps: 6 for 46
 Red flags: 0
 Time of race: 3 hours, 8 minutes and 1 second
 Average speed:

Stage Results

Stage 1
Laps: 100

Stage 2
Laps: 100

Final Stage Results

Stage 3
Laps: 202

Race statistics
 Lead changes: 7 among different drivers
 Cautions/Laps: 6 for 46
 Red flags: 0
 Time of race: 3 hours, 8 minutes and 1 second
 Average speed:

Media

Television
Fox Sports covered their 18th race at the Richmond Raceway. Mike Joy, two-time Richmond winner Jeff Gordon and six-time Richmond winner Darrell Waltrip had the call in the booth for the race. Regan Smith, Vince Welch and Matt Yocum handled the pit road duties for the television side.

Radio
MRN had the radio call for the race which was also simulcast on Sirius XM NASCAR Radio. Joe Moore, Jeff Striegle and six-time Richmond winner Rusty Wallace called the race in the booth when the field raced down the frontstretch. Mike Bagley called the race from a platform inside the backstretch when the field raced down the backstretch. Winston Kelley, Alex Hayden and Glenn Jarrett worked pit road for the radio side.

Standings after the race

Drivers' Championship standings

Manufacturers' Championship standings

Note: Only the first 16 positions are included for the driver standings.
. – Driver has clinched a position in the Monster Energy NASCAR Cup Series playoffs.

References

Toyota Owners 400
Toyota Owners 400
Toyota Owners 400
NASCAR races at Richmond Raceway